Seven Years in Tibet may refer to:

Book
 Seven Years in Tibet, an autobiographical travel book written by Austrian mountaineer Heinrich Harrer.

Movies
Seven Years in Tibet (1956 film), a British documentary film directed by Hans Nieter
Seven Years in Tibet (1997 film), a film based on the book starring Brad Pitt

Other
"Seven Years in Tibet" (song), a single by David Bowie and Reeves Gabrels from the 1997 album Earthling